Orašje Popovo is a village in the municipality of Trebinje, Republika Srpska, Bosnia and Herzegovina and partially in the municipality of Ravno, Bosnia and Herzegovina.

Demographics 
According to the 2013 census, its population was 33: 3 Croats living in the Trebinje part and 30 Serbs with 25 of them in the Ravno part.

References

Populated places in Trebinje
Populated places in Ravno, Bosnia and Herzegovina